The AniManGaki (AMG) is an annual ACG event in Malaysia.

Name
AniManGaki is a portmanteau of the words Anime, Manga, Games, and Gaki. 'Gaki' in Japanese slang means 'brat'.

History
AniManGaki originally started in 2009 and was founded by Yvonne Sing. It was initially organized by the Anime Club of Sunway University College. In 2011, Sunway University College had a name change to Sunway University and a year later in 2012, AniManGaki separated from the university. Today, it is an event organized by the AniManGaki Organizing Committee under Rakugaki Events PLT.

Projects
AniManGaki consists of several parallel smaller-scale projects, such as AMG-Chan (since 2017), ACE (since 2019) and Jom Cosplay! (since 2022).

References

External links

 

2009 establishments in Malaysia
Anime conventions in Malaysia
Multigenre conventions
Recurring events established in 2009